For the Islamic concept of Jihad-e-Asghar see:

 Jihad-e-Asghar in mainstream Islam
 Jihad-e-Asghar in Ismailism